Millie Hughes may refer to:

Millie Hughes-Fulford
Milly Hughes, a character in the film Village of the Damned